Ovye Monday Shedrack (born 14 August 1992) is a Nigerian football player who plays as a center back for Romanian Liga III club Gloria Băneasa, on loan from CS Eforie.

Career
In January 2017, Shedrack went on trial with Kazakhstan Premier League side Shakhter Karagandy. 

After a spell at Finnish club TP-47 in the first half of the 2018 season, Shedrack moved to Omani club Sur SC in August 2018. In 2019, he played for Romanian club Carmen București.

In April 2021, Shedrack signed with Romanian club CS Eforie.

Career statistics

Club

References

External links
 Milsami Profile
 
 Ovye Monday Shedrack at ZeroZero

1992 births
Living people
Nigerian footballers
Nigerian expatriate footballers
Association football defenders
People from Lafia
FC Milsami Orhei players
Al-Arabi SC (Kuwait) players
FC Zimbru Chișinău players
AFC Dacia Unirea Brăila players
Liga III players
Moldovan Super Liga players
Kuwait Premier League players
Nigerian expatriate sportspeople in Kuwait
Expatriate footballers in Kuwait
Nigerian expatriate sportspeople in Moldova
Expatriate footballers in Moldova
Nigerian expatriate sportspeople in Oman
Expatriate footballers in Oman
Nigerian expatriate sportspeople in Finland
Expatriate footballers in Finland
Nigerian expatriate sportspeople in Romania
Expatriate footballers in Romania